Hassanal Bolkiah Mosque is a mosque in Tutong, the town of Tutong District in Brunei. The mosque was opened in 1966; it can accommodate 1,000 worshippers at one time.

History 
The construction of the mosque officially began on 17 April 1965 and completed by the middle of the following year. It was inaugurated on 26 August 1966 by Hassanal Bolkiah, the present Sultan of Brunei who at that time was still the crown prince.

On 7 October 2016, the mosque held an event to commemorate the golden jubilee of its existence.

See also
 List of mosques in Brunei

References

External links 
 Hassanal Bolkiah Mosque on the Ministry of Religious Affairs' website 

1966 establishments in Brunei
Mosques completed in 1966
Mosques in Brunei
Tutong District